Propelargonidins are a type of condensed tannins formed from epiafzelechin. They yield pelargonidin when depolymerized under oxidative conditions.

Propelargonidins can be found in the rhizomes of the fern Drynaria fortunei, in buckwheat (Fagopyrum esculentum), in the edible halophyte Mesembryanthemum edule.

Examples 
 Geranins A and B, dimers found in Geranium niveum
 Selligueain A, a trimer found in the rhizome of Selliguea feei
 the trimeric propelargonidin epiafzelechin-(4β→8)-epiafzelechin-(4β→8)-4′-O-methyl-(−)-epigallocatechin can be isolated from the stem bark of Heisteria pallida.

References 

Condensed tannins